The Central Texas Gravel Locomotive No. 210 is a historic diesel-electric switch locomotive at the Arkansas Railroad Museum in Pine Bluff, Arkansas.  It was built by General Electric in 1956, and is a well-preserved example of the second generation of GE's 25-ton switching locomotives, a popular model used widely in freight yards throughout the nation and internationally.  This model was first used by the Central Texas Gravel Company, and then by the Gifford-Hill Company, which operated it at yards in Shreveport, Louisiana and Eagle Hill, Arkansas.  The locomotive was acquired by the museum in 2005, with plans to use it for moving rolling stock within its facilities.

The locomotive was listed on the National Register of Historic Places in 2007.

See also
National Register of Historic Places listings in Jefferson County, Arkansas

References

Arkansas Railroad Museum
Individual locomotives of the United States
National Register of Historic Places in Pine Bluff, Arkansas
Railway locomotives on the National Register of Historic Places in Arkansas
Tourist attractions in Pine Bluff, Arkansas